The c. 80 km x 40 km sized Rubielos de la Cérida structure is a claimed impact feature located in Aragon, northeast Spain, north of Teruel purported to have formed during the Upper Eocene or Oligocene (roughly 30 - 40 Mill. years ago). The name is derived from the nearby village of Rubielos de la Cérida. The claim that the structure represents an impact feature is rejected by the majority of scientists, and the mainstream consensus is that the supposed structure is explained by non impact related tectonic structures, namely the Jiloca-Calatayud graben and the Alfambra-Teruel graben.

Reception
The origin of the Rubielos de la Cérida structure has been debated, and the mainstream opinion of Spanish geologists is that the structure is not an impact feature. The supposed shock effects are actually tectonic features, the purported impact ejecta are Cenozoic alluvial fans or conglomerates and supposed impact breccias and dike breccias are interpreted as karst features and soil formations. The opposition against the impact origin for Rubielos de la Cérida (and Azuara) has been supported by an analysis and paper (Langenhorst & Deutsch 1996) rejecting the occurrence of shock metamorphism in Azuara rocks. It is not listed in the Earth Impact Database.

See also 

 Azuara impact structure

References

External links

 Comprehensive report on the Rubielos de la Cérida basin
 Comprehensive report on the Azuara structure
 Jarmo Moilanen's list of impact structures of the world
 The impact breccia page
 The suevite page
 Shatter cones
 EDEIS Expert Database on Earth Impact Structures
 Impact melt page - impact melt rocks
 Shock metamorphism page
 The Azuara - Rubielos de la Cérida controversy
 Understanding the Impact Cratering Process: a Simple Approach

Impact craters of Spain
Possible impact craters on Earth
Sistema Ibérico
Province of Teruel
Province of Zaragoza